Eni Imami (born 19 December 1992) is an Albanian professional footballer who plays as a midfielder for Albanian club Dinamo Tirana.

Club career

Dinamo Tirana
Imami made his professional debut at 17 years and five months old on 21 April 2010 in a 1–2 home loss to Teuta. With Dinamo already having secured the Kategoria Superiore title for the 18th time in history, Imami got his chance and went on to make three other appearances as substitute, collecting 132 minutes.

Biaschesi
In June 2013, Imami completed a transfer to 2. Liga Interregional side Biaschesi after successfully passing a one-week trial two months earlier. He played in Swiss' 5th tier in the first part of 2013–14 season, recording ten league appearances before returning in Albania at the end of the year.

Teuta
Imami signed for Teuta in January 2014 on a short-term contract. Imami would only make on league appearance during his time at Teuta, and it came on 30 April 2014 in a 2-0 away win over Lushnja. He was subbed on for Akil Jakupi at halftime.

Kukësi
On 21 January 2016, Imami joined Kukësi by penning a three-year contract, worth €500 per month. He made his debut for his new club two days later by playing in the second half of the match against Teuta, valid for the first leg of 2015–16 Albanian Cup quarter-finals, which was lost 1–0. He spent the second part of the 2015–16 season on bench, making only three league appearances, including one as starter, as Kukësi finished as runner-up to Skënderbeu.

He won his first silverware with Kukësi on 22 May 2016, the Albanian Cup, after defeating Laçi on penalty shootouts.

Imami became a regular starter under Ernest Gjoka in the 2016–17 season; he made 22 league appearances, collecting 1868 minutes as Kukësi won their first ever championship by defeating Skënderbeu on controversial fashion in the penultimate matchday. He scored his first goal for Kukësi on 1 February 2017 in the first leg of cup's quarter-final against Tirana. In August 2017, he demanded a wage increase to president Safet Gjici; his request was granted.

Imami played 31 league appearances during the 2017–18 season as Kukësi failed to retain the title. Under manager Mladen Milinković and later Peter Pacult, Imami was used as left-back, centre-back, left midfielder and central midfielder. On 27 May 2018, he was involved in a verbal confrontation with coach Peter Pacult, with the player reportedly asking the coach about his limited playing time.

One day later, Imami left the club after two-and-a-half years after handing a transfer request.

Tirana
On 29 June 2018, Imami was unveiled as Tirana newest player by signing a two-year contract.

Career statistics

Club

Honours
Dinamo Tirana
Kategoria Superiore: 2009–10

Kukësi
Kategoria Superiore: 2016–17
Albanian Cup: 2015–16
Albanian Supercup: 2016

Vllaznia
Albanian Cup: 2020–21

References

External links
FSHF profile

1992 births
Living people
Footballers from Tirana
Albanian footballers
Association football wingers
Albania under-21 international footballers
Albania youth international footballers
FK Dinamo Tirana players
KF Laçi players
KF Teuta Durrës players
FK Kukësi players
KF Tirana players
KF Skënderbeu Korçë players
KF Vllaznia Shkodër players
Kategoria Superiore players
Kategoria e Parë players
Albanian expatriate footballers
Expatriate footballers in Switzerland
Albanian expatriate sportspeople in Switzerland